Norway was represented by Anne-Karine Strøm, with the song "Mata Hari", at the 1976 Eurovision Song Contest, which took place on 3 April in The Hague. "Mata Hari" was chosen as the Norwegian entry at the Melodi Grand Prix on 7 February. This was a third Eurovision appearance in four contests for Strøm.

Before Eurovision

Melodi Grand Prix 1976 
The Melodi Grand Prix 1976 was held at Centralteatret in Oslo, hosted by Jan Voigt. Five songs were presented in the final with each song sung twice by different singers, once with a small combo and once with a full orchestra which was conducted by Helge Hurum. The winning song was chosen by voting from ten regional juries.

At Eurovision 
On the night of the final Strøm performed 9th in the running order, following the Netherlands and preceding Greece. "Mata Hari" was an uptempo song which had been given a very contemporary disco arrangement, and prior to the contest had attracted more attention than was the norm for Norwegian entries at the time. It was not expected to challenge for the win as the consensus was that the title would be fought out between France and the United Kingdom, but was widely predicted as likely to give Norway one of its better placements to date. However things did not go to plan, and at the close of voting "Mata Hari" had picked up only 7 points, placing Norway last of the 18 entries, the fourth time the country had finished the evening at the foot of the scoreboard. However, in the broadcast, France failed to award its 4 points to Yugoslavia, so the two countries swapped places. In the wake of the poor result, it was widely suggested that Strøm's odd presentation – in which she appeared on stage in a very unflattering pair of sunglasses, which she proceeded at apparently random intervals to remove and wave around and then put back on again – may have been puzzling and distracting for viewers and juries. The Norwegian jury awarded its 12 points to contest winners the United Kingdom.

Voting

References

External links 
Full national final on nrk.no

1976
Countries in the Eurovision Song Contest 1976
1976
Eurovision
Eurovision